Christopher B. Duncan (born December 4, 1964) is an American actor. He is known for his television series regular roles like Braxton P. Hartnabrig on The Jamie Foxx Show, President William Johnson in The First Family, and his portrayal of Clarence Weidman on Veronica Mars.

Early life and education

Duncan received his B.F.A. in Acting from the University of Colorado, Boulder.
His father is retired from the Air Force. Christopher lived in Germany, Japan, New Mexico, Colorado & Chicago. His mother was a registered nurse.
He has two brothers - Robert & Charles. His youngest brother, Phillip, died in 2018.

Career
Known for his range as an actor - Duncan had a starring role as Braxton P. Hartnabrig on The Jamie Foxx Show. He played the leading role of President William Johnson in the sitcom The First Family.

He also had long standing recurring roles on Your Honor, Black Lightning, The Resident, Veronica Mars, Aliens in America, Lincoln Heights, Jane By Design, General Hospital, Switched at Birth, The District, & Soul Food. His guest starring credits include American Soul, Legacies, Modern Family, 9-1-1, Chicago PD, Martin, Rosewood, Castle, NCIS, Bones, Mental, ER, Boston Legal, 24, CSI, & The Practice.

He's played President Barack Obama on The Tonight Show with Jay Leno as well as in the 2010 film My Name Is Khan.

Filmography

Film

Television

Video games

Notes

External links 
 
 

Living people
African-American male actors
Male actors from Nebraska
Actors from Lincoln, Nebraska
University of Colorado Boulder alumni
American male television actors
American male film actors
1964 births
20th-century American male actors
21st-century American male actors
20th-century African-American people
21st-century African-American people